David Wheeler (born November 24, 1979) is an American attorney and politician serving as a member of the South Dakota Senate from the 22nd district. Elected in November 2020, he assumed office on January 12, 2021.

Early life and education 
Wheeler was born in Huron, South Dakota. He earned a Bachelor of Arts degree in political science, Master of Public Administration, and Juris Doctor from the University of South Dakota.

Career 
Wheeler has worked as an attorney for Blue, Wheeler & Banks LLP in Huron. He was also a member of the Huron School Board for seven year and was appointed to serve on the South Dakota Lottery Commission by Governor Dennis Daugaard. He was elected to the South Dakota Senate in November 2020 and assumed office on January 12, 2021.

References 

1979 births
People from Huron, South Dakota
University of South Dakota alumni
University of South Dakota School of Law alumni
Republican Party South Dakota state senators
South Dakota lawyers
21st-century American politicians
Living people